Samoana attenuata is a species of air-breathing tropical land snail, a terrestrial pulmonate gastropod mollusk in the family Partulidae. This species is endemic to French Polynesia.

Conservation
The slender snail was widespread in Society Islands. But in the late 1980s, carnivorous Euglandina rosea was introduced into Society Islands and Samoana attenuata snails disappearing quickly. Populations on Raiatea thought to be extinct until 2006.
now, the species is living on Raiatea, Tahiti, and Moorea. Unfortunately, the species is extinct on Bora Bora.

The species was one of few species of Partulids which was native in Bora Bora.

References

External links
 

A
Fauna of French Polynesia
Molluscs of Oceania
Critically endangered fauna of Oceania
Taxa named by William Harper Pease
Taxonomy articles created by Polbot